Dominican embassy may refer to:

List of diplomatic missions of Dominica
List of diplomatic missions of the Dominican Republic